Damian Piotrowski (born 9 January 1987) is a Polish professional footballer who most recently played as a midfielder for Radunia Stężyca.

Career
On 14 October 2019, Piotrowski joined Chrobry Głogów on a free transfer, signing a contract for the rest of the season.

References

External links
 
 

1987 births
Living people
Association football midfielders
Polish footballers
Zagłębie Lubin players
Górnik Polkowice players
Bruk-Bet Termalica Nieciecza players
Chrobry Głogów players
Wisła Płock players
Chojniczanka Chojnice players
Ekstraklasa players
I liga players
II liga players